Auburn Fire House No. 2, also known as Auburn Hose Company No. 2, at the corner of Washington, Main, & Commercial Streets in Auburn, Placer County, California, was built in 1891.  It was listed on the National Register of Historic Places in 2011.

Architecture: Shingle Style

See also 
 Auburn City Hall and Fire House
 Auburn Fire House No. 1
 National Register of Historic Places listings in Placer County, California

References

Fire stations on the National Register of Historic Places in California
National Register of Historic Places in Placer County, California
Shingle Style architecture in California
Fire stations completed in 1891
1891 establishments in California
Auburn, California